Lavenone is a town and comune in the province of Brescia, in Lombardy. It is situated on the right bank of the river Chiese, a few km downstream from Lake Idro. The commune stretches into the mountains and includes the mountain village of Presegno.

Notable people 
Marta Roberti, artist and researcher

Sources

Cities and towns in Lombardy